The 2013–14 Nicholls State Colonels women's basketball team represented Nicholls State University during the 2013–14 NCAA Division I women's basketball season. The Colonels, led by third year head coach DoBee Plaisance, played their home games at Stopher Gym and are members of the Southland Conference.

Roster
Source:

Schedule

|-
!colspan=9| Regular Season

|-
!colspan=9| 2014 Southland Conference women's basketball tournament

Source

See also
2013–14 Nicholls State Colonels men's basketball team

References

Nicholls Colonels women's basketball seasons
Nicholls State
Nicholls
Nicholls